Maanga is an administrative ward in the Mbeya Urban district of the Mbeya Region of Tanzania. 

In 2016 the Tanzania National Bureau of Statistics report there were 7,584 people in the ward, from 6,881 in 2012.

Neighborhoods 
The ward has 7 neighborhoods.
 Maanga A
 Maanga B
 Maendeleo
 Mafiat
 Mwamfupe
 Ndongole
 Sinde

References 

Wards of Mbeya Region